Swayne College, founded as the Swayne School, was a school for African American students in Montgomery, Alabama. Built in 1865 and dedicated in 1869, it was named for General Wager Swayne who led the U.S. Army in Alabama after the American Civil War and later oversaw the Freedmen's Bureau in the state. He helped establish schools for African Americans in Alabama.
The school operated from 1868 to 1937

The school was located at 632 Union Street, near Grove Street, on a site submitted by Elijah Cook and was run by the American Missionary Association. George Stanley Pope was the school's first principal. Its first African American principal was Charles Duncan, a graduate of Fisk University. Richard Bailey writes that the school was among the first to utilize the "bush school" strategy, where educators sent the school's best students into the community to teach other African-American children. Tuition for Montgomery students was free, those from neighboring areas paid $1.

Swayne College was demolished in 1948 and succeeded on the same site in 1949 by the Booker T. Washington School, Montgomery's first high school for African Americans.

A historical marker commemorates the schools' site.

The community's schools later included Booker T. Washington Magnet High School, a successor to George Washington Carver High School, and the Carver Creative and Performing Arts Center (CCPAC).

See also
Montgomery Industrial School for Girls

References

Montgomery, Alabama
Defunct schools in Alabama